Mikhail Hryhorovych Krivoshlyk (1864 — after 1918), was a Russian Journalist, Writer, editor-publisher and State Councillor.

Mikhail Hryhorovych Krivoshlyk graduated from the Lubny Men's Gymnasium. He graduated from the Faculty of Law at Saint Petersburg State University. Krivoshlyk associate editor of the newspaper «Vedomosti of the St. Petersburg City Government and the Metropolitan Police» in 1892 — 1898. He editor of the newspaper «Vedomosti of the St. Petersburg City Government and the Metropolitan Police» in 1898 — 1914. Krivoshlyk was dismissed from his post, on him, as well as on his patron, mayor D.V. Drachevsky, started a business for abuse of service.

Krivoshlyk had awards: the Order of St. Anne and St. Stanislav III degree, medal from the French president, silver cross of the Order of St. Alexander from the Bulgarian prince, star from the emir of Bukhara, order of the officer's cross Italian Crown.

In 1896 he wrote the book «Historical anecdotes from the life of Russian remarkable people», during his lifetime it was published eight times. Mikhail Hryhorovych Krivoshlyk was the spiritual son of John of Kronstadt. He published a book of John of Kronstadt «Мысли протоиерея Иоанна Ильича Сергиева, настоятеля Кронштадтского Андреевского собора О различных предметах христианской веры и нравственности : С портр. и краткой биогр. пастыря».

Literary works
 Исторические анекдоты из жизни русских замечательных людей : (С крат. биогр. их) / М.Г. Кривошлык. - Санкт-Петербург : тип. В.М. Курочкина, 1896. - 4, 156 с.
 То же. - 2-е изд., доп. - Спб.: К. Геруц, 1897. - [6], 192 с.: портр., 1 л. портр.
 То же. - 3-е изд. - 1898. 
 То же. - 4-е изд. - 1898.
 То же. - 5-е изд. - 1898.
 То же. - 6-е изд. - 1898. 
 То же. - 7-е изд., (доп.). - Спб.: М. Г. Кривошлык, 1903. - [8], 233 с.: портр. -
 То же. - 8-е изд., доп. - 1909
 То же. - [Репринт. изд.]. (Вых. дан. ориг.: СПб: Изд. К. Герунца, 1898) - М. : Совмест. сов.-австр. предприятие "Х. Г. С.", 1990]
 То же. - [Репринт. изд.].  - М. : Изд.-полигр. фирма "АНС-Принт", 1991]
 Великие полководцы мира: в биографиях и анекдотах с портретами  / М. Г. Кривошлык. - Спб.: Б. и., 1898.
 То же. - 2-е изд., доп. - 1899. - [8], 143 с.: портр.
 То же. - 3-е изд., доп. - 1904. - [8], 163 с.: портр.
 То же. - 4-е изд., доп. - 1904. - [8], 163 с.: ил.; 
 То же. - 4-е изд., - Москва : ЛЕНАНД, 2015.
 Мир вам! : (братский листок) / ред.-изд. М. Г. Кривошлык. - Петроград, 1918.

References
 Наталия Гречук. "Петербург. Застывшие мгновения. История города в фотографиях Карла Буллы и его современников"./ «Благонамеренный и вполне благонадежный»/ стр. 79-85/ Litres, 5 сент. 2017 
 Категория:Кривошлык, Михаил Григорьевич (1864- )
 Никон (Рождественский Николай Иванович; архиеп. Вологодский и Тотемский; 1851-1919). Мои дневники / архиеп. Никон. - Сергиев Посад : Тип. Свято-Троицкой Сергиевой Лавры, 1914-. - 26 см. - ((Из "Троицкого Слова", ...)).  1912. - 1915 (обл. 1916). - 190, 1 с. / стр. 97
 Кривошлык Михаил Григорьевич о Соловках в анекдотах
 Кузменко, Иосиф Емельянович (ок. 1848-1913). Биография редактора газеты "Ведомости спб. градоначальства" М.Г. Кривошлыка : К десятилетию гос. службы, обществ. и лит. деятельности / Сост. бывший учитель М.Г. Кривошлыка - преп. истории и географии в Лубен. муж. гимназии, с. с. И.Е. Кузменко. - Санкт-Петербург : типо-лит. Генералова, 1902. - [6] с., 1 л. портр.;
 Сабашниковы: Михаил Васильевич (1871 - 1943), Сергей Васильевич (1873 - 1909) : архивный фонд, 1901-1934. - 1119 ед. хр. / стр. 183
 Венгеров, Семен Афанасьевич (1855-1920). Источники словаря русских писателей / Собр. С.А. Венгеров. Т. I-IV. - Санкт-Петербург : тип. Имп. академии наук, 1900-1917. - 4 т.; 24. Т. 3. Карамышев - Ломоносов. - Петроград, 1914. - (4), 524 с. стр. 280
 Страница:Падение царского режима. Том 7.pdf/474

Specific

1864 births
1918 deaths
Male journalists
19th-century writers from the Russian Empire